Zone 2 may refer to:
Travelcard Zone 2, of the Transport for London zonal system
Hardiness zone, a geographically defined zone in which a specific category of plant life is capable of growing
Zone 2 of Milan
NBA In the Zone 2
Zone 2, Rodrigues
Zone 2 (rap group) - UK drill collective based in London.